Hansford is a surname and rare male given name, which originates from the Old English, meaning "'Ford near protected temple'".

Surname
Alan Hansford (born 1968), English cricketer
Dianne Hansford (born 1964), American computer scientist
Edwin Hansford (1895-1959), Canadian politician
Frank Hansford (1874-1952), American former professional baseball player
Gregg Hansford (1952-1995), Australian motorcycle and touring car racer
Shooting of Danny Hansford

Given name
Hansford Rowe (1924-2017), American character actor
Hansford Rowe (born 1954), American bass guitarist
Hansford T. Johnson (born 1936), American General

See also
Hansford, Nova Scotia
Hansford, West Virginia
Hansford County, Texas
USS Hansford (APA-106), an American attack transport

References